Kocian or Kocián is a surname. Notable people with the surname include:

 František Kocián, Czech wrestler
 Ján Kocian (born 1958), Slovak footballer and manager
 Jaroslav Kocián (1883–1950), Czech violinist, classical composer and teacher
 Madison Kocian (born 1997), American artistic gymnast

See also
 Kocian Quartet
 Kocjan (disambiguation)
 Kocyan
 Kóczián
 Ditte Kotzian

Czech-language surnames
Slovak-language surnames